Glow is the third studio album by American country musician Brett Eldredge. Released on October 28, 2016, by Atlantic Nashville this is his first Christmas album.

A deluxe edition of the album was released on October 26, 2018, featuring 7 new songs.

Commercial performance
The album debuted at No. 29 on Billboard 200, and No. 2 on the Top Country Albums chart, selling 14,000 copies in the United States in its first week. The album has sold 94,800 copies in the US as of January 2017.

Track listing

The Deluxe release has additional tracks.

Personnel
Adapted from AllMusic.

 Randy Andos – trombone
 Chris Cardona – viola
 Sean Carney – violin
 Tim Cobb – contrabass
 Joe D'Ambrosio – coordination
 Sylvia D'Avanzo – violin
 Barry Danielian – trumpet
 Michael Davis – trombone
 Jonathan Dinklage – violin
 Brett Eldredge – lead vocals
 David Finck – acoustic bass, electric bass 
 Nick Finzer – trombone
 Chris Gelbuda – engineer
 Isabel Hagen – viola
 Aaron Heick – alto saxophone
 Josh Hoge – arranger
 Clarice Jensen – cello
 Rita Johnson – coordination
 Tony Kadleck – trumpet
 Adda Kridler – violin
 Dennis Mackrel – drums
 Greg Magers – engineer
 David Mann – alto saxophone
 Nick Marchione – trumpet
 Rob Mounsey – arranger, conductor, piano, producer
 Yuko Naito-Gotay – violin
 Jeff Nelson – trombone
 Jay Newland – engineer, mixing, producer
 Nate Odden – engineer
 Tomina Parvanova – harp
 Charles Pillow – tenor saxophone
 Dave Riekenberg – tenor saxophone
 Roger Rosenberg – baritone saxophone
 Antoine Silverman – concertmaster
 David Spinozza – acoustic guitar, electric guitar
 Meghan Trainor – vocals on "Baby, It's Cold Outside"
 Scott Wendholt – trumpet
 Mark Wilder – mastering
 Anja Wood – cello
 Paul Woodiel – violin

Charts

Weekly charts

Year-end charts

References

2016 Christmas albums
Brett Eldredge albums
Atlantic Records albums
Christmas albums by American artists
Country Christmas albums